Jews on Land is a 1927 Soviet short documentary film directed by Abram Room.

Plot 
The Soviet propaganda documentary "The Jew and the Earth" was filmed by OZET as part of a campaign against anti-Semitism in the USSR in the late 1920s. The film shows how the Jewish workers colonize the Black Sea area and Crimean lands. The communes are created for successful development of the abandoned lands, in which people are living only internal colonial life. Jewish colonists are represented as one large family against the backdrop of manifestations of anti-Semitism that intensified in the USSR in the late 1920s.

Crew

 Director - Abram Room
 Writers - Vladimir Mayakovsky, Abram Room, and Viktor Shklovsky
 Cameraman - Albert Queen
 Assistant director - Lilya Brik

References

External links 

Jews on Land on OZET site.

1927 films
1920s Russian-language films
Soviet silent short films
Soviet black-and-white films
Soviet short documentary films
1927 documentary films
Black-and-white documentary films
1920s short documentary films
Documentary films about Jews and Judaism
Jews and Judaism in the Soviet Union